The Republican Party of Turkmenistan is one of several dissident political parties that have been outlawed within Turkmenistan. Leaders of the exile-based RPT include Nurmuhammet Hanamow who went into exile in 2002 and Annadurdy Hajyýew, whose sister Ogulsapar Myradowa died in a Turkmen prison in September 2006. The latest opposition party, RPT operates in exile - since all opposition is banned within Turkmenistan, it was forced to form and operate from abroad.

Turkmen in exile
There are two major groupings of Turkmen in exile. The first are opposition or dissidents, usually of a democratic bent. The second are exiled Turkmen politicians, often former high-ranking government officials who were incriminated in Niyazov's alleged attempted murder in November 2002, reformists of varying stripes.

With the death of Saparmurat Niyazov on December 21, 2006, some thought the situation might change, possibly opening for the expansion of multiple parties within the nation, but such hopes did not materialize, as Niyazov's successor Gurbanguly Berdimuhamedow made no substantial changes to the country's system, with the DPT remaining the ruling party and only Niyazov's cult of personality being reduced.

See also
Politics of Turkmenistan

References

External links
Aide Says Ukrainian President Sacked Ambassador Over Turkmen Row

Political parties established in 2003
2003 establishments in Turkmenistan
Banned political parties
Political parties in Turkmenistan